Saheb Biwi Aur Gangster is a 2011 Indian romantic thriller film directed by Tigmanshu Dhulia with screenwriter Sanjay Chauhan and starring Jimmy Sheirgill, Mahi Gill, and Randeep Hooda in lead roles. It is the first installment of Saheb, Biwi Aur Gangster film series.

Plot
Based in a small town in the state of Uttar Pradesh, Saheb Biwi Aur Gangster is a story packed with intrigue betrayal and ambition between a beautiful Raani, her husband Raja and an ambitious young man Babloo.

The Raja and his Raani live in their ancestral royal house trying to maintain the status and structure their ancestors had left behind. But due to the changing times, some extreme financial conditions and the long-gone habit of a royal having a mistress, Raja tries hard to maintain his status and financial conditions. His rival political party, belonging to Gainda Singh, is on a constant mission to eliminate the Raja and his allies, to get a hold of the administration, which has been with this royal family for decades. Eventually, he is left with just one ally, Kanhaiya, who is Saheb's most trusted and dangerous servant. Due to the Raja's interest in his beautiful mistress, Raani yearns for his attention and tries to get him to return to her. The Raja starts taking contract killing assignments to be able to cope up with his lifestyle and to be able to get a stronger hold over his political situation while campaigning for the elections, which becomes a difficult battle considering the loss of his allies and deteriorating financial situation.

The drama deepens when the same rival gang plants Babloo to get information and plot the Raja's killing, as the temporary driver for Raani. Raani, saddened by the lack of her husband's attention and slightly hysterical due to the same, gets into a sexual relationship with Babloo who seems to be giving more of his time to her. In this process, Babloo falls deeply in love with Raani and confesses his assignment in front of Raja. The Raani uses Babloo to get the mistress killed to gain her husband. Babloo manages to fulfill her demand but in turn gets ambitious, wanting the Raani and the power which Saheb now holds for himself.

The climax is set at a point where Babloo has planned to execute Saheb and succeeds in shooting him and Kanhaiya. After intercourse with his mistress, she reminds him of her payment of Rs. 20000 and he reminds her of her stature and that he will return her money the next time he visits. Later, Raani has Babloo shot dead stating that "he can only be a partner in the bedroom, but not as a Saheb". Saheb slowly recovering, as he wins the election. In the end, Raani is shown appointing a new driver for herself, which hints at a sequel.

Cast
Jimmy Sheirgill as Aditya Pratap Singh
Mahi Gill as Madhavi Devi
Randeep Hooda as Lalit / Babloo
Vipin Sharma as Gaindha Singh
Deepraj Rana as Kanhaiya
Shreya Narayan as Mahua
Deepal Shaw as Suman
Mukesh Tyagi as Jaiswal
Sharad Kakkar as Tandon
Tigmanshu Dhulia in a special appearance
Resham as Lalit's girlfriend
Rajiv Gupta as MLA Prabhu Tiwari
Mukti Mohan in an item number
Jay Patel as Jay

Production
Its title was inspired by that of Sahib Bibi Aur Ghulam (1962).

Soundtrack

Track list

Reception

Critical reception
Saheb, Biwi Aur Gangster received critical acclaim from top critics. Taran Adarsh from Bollywood Hungama rated it 3.5/5 stars applauding its powerful plot, engaging script, commanding dialogue, and super performances. Nikhat Kazmi from the Times of India gave the film 4/5 stars calling the film a "must watch". Aniruddha Guha from DNA India gave the film 4/5 stars and said, "Saheb Biwi Aur Gangster draws you in from the very start, keeps you hooked throughout, and ends on a high." Guha also applauded the perfect mix of romance, action, and humour in the film. Ayaz Shaikh from Rediff.com commended the film and said "Saheb Biwi Aur Gangster is a gripping tale of intricate politics, love and betrayal", and gave the film 3.5/5 stars.

Box office
Saheb, Biwi Aur Gangster collected around  nett on its first day of its release. Saheb, Biwi Aur Gangster remained on the lower side with around  nett over its first weekend. Saheb, Biwi Aur Gangster remained steady but on the lower side on the weekdays as it grossed  nett approx in its first week. It is grossed  at the end of its theatrical run.

Awards and nominations
Star Screen Awards
Nominated: Best Actor In A Negative Role (male)—Jimmy Sheirgill
Nominated: Best Actress In A Negative Role (female)—Mahi Gill

Filmfare Awards
Nominated: Best Actress—Mahi Gill
Nominated: Best Screenplay—Tigmanshu Dhulia

Stardust Awards (Stardust Searchlight Awards)
Won: Best Director—Tigmanshu Dhulia
Nominated: Best Film—Rahul Mittra
Nominated: Best Actor—Jimmy Shergill
Nominated: Best Actress—Mahi Gill

Zee Cine Awards
Nominated: Best Actor in a Negative Role—Jimmy Shergill

IIFA Awards
Nominated: Best Actress—Mahi Gill
Nominated: Best Supporting Actor—Randeep Hooda

Apsara Awards
Nominated: Best Actress in a Leading Role—Mahi Gill
Nominated: Best Actor in a Supporting Role—Randeep Hooda
Nominated: Best Story—Sanjay Chouhan and Tigmanshu Dhulia
Nominated: Best Editor—Rahul Srivastava

Sequel
Following the huge critical success of the film, a sequel was announced. Principal shooting started in April 2012 and was completed in October 2012. The sequel, titled Saheb, Biwi Aur Gangster Returns, was released on 8 March 2013. It starred Jimmy Sheirgill and Mahi Gill, who reprised their roles from the previous film, as well as new additions Irrfan Khan and Soha Ali Khan. Raj Babbar and Mugdha Godse also appeared in the film.

A third sequel, titled Saheb, Biwi Aur Gangster 3, was released on 27 July 2018.

References

External links

Saheb Biwi Aur Gangster on Movie Talkies

2011 films
2010s Hindi-language films
Films shot in Gujarat
2010s romantic thriller films
Films scored by Ankit Tiwari
Films scored by Abhishek Ray
Films scored by Mukhtar Sahota
Films scored by Jaidev Kumar
Indian romantic thriller films
Films directed by Tigmanshu Dhulia